Bishop Tonnos Catholic Secondary School is a Catholic secondary school located in Ancaster. It is part of the Hamilton-Wentworth Catholic District School Board and is home to students of seven feeder schools.

History

Founding 
Bishop Tonnos Catholic Secondary School was founded in 2004. In 2002, the Hamilton-Wentworth Catholic District School Board approved the construction of a new secondary school in Ancaster to alleviate overcrowding at St. Thomas More Catholic Secondary School on the West Mountain and St. Mary Catholic Secondary School in West Hamilton.

An official ground breaking ceremony was held on May 22, 2003, on the grounds of the former  Marshall Potato Farm on Highway 53 just west of Fiddler's Green Road.

The school was officially opened in February 2005, and received its official blessing on April 17, 2005, by Bishop Anthony F. Tonnos, for whom the school was named after.

Construction 
The  school was built at a cost of $24-million with a Ministry rated capacity of 1,250 students. A field blessing and dedication, officiated by Bishop Anthony F. Tonnos, was held on October 6, 2017.

Charity work 
Students from Bishop Tonnos went on a mission trip to the Caribbean with Dominican Republic Education and Medical Support, or DREAMS, in 2019. DREAMS is a support program that provides students with a first-hand experience of life and living conditions in the developing south. Students built a two-room house in a mountain village. The schools also hosts charity events, such as movie-screening fundraisers.

Feeder schools 
 Corpus Christi
 Holy Name of Mary
 Immaculate Conception
 St. Ann - Ancaster
 St. Joachim
 St. Teresa of Avila
 St. Thérèse of Lisieux

Notable alumni 
 Laura Fortino – women's ice hockey competitor
 Michael Ciccarelli – competitive snowboarder
 Sarah Nurse – women's ice hockey competitor

See also 
 List of secondary schools in Ontario

References

External links 
 
 

High schools in Hamilton, Ontario
Catholic secondary schools in Ontario
Educational institutions established in 2002
2002 establishments in Ontario
Roman Catholic schools in Ontario